Robert Edgar is the name of:

Robert Allan Edgar (born 1940), U.S. federal judge
Robert Stuart Edgar (1930–2016), geneticist
Robert W. Edgar (1943–2013), former U.S. representative from Pennsylvania